Regina Isabel Luisa Pacini Quintero (January 6, 1871, Lisbon, Portugal – September 18, 1965, Buenos Aires, Argentina) was a lyric soprano and First Lady of Argentina as wife of Argentine politician Marcelo Torcuato de Alvear.

Biography
Pacini was born to Italian baritone Pietro Andrea Giorgi-Pacini and Spanish Felisa Quintero in Lisbon, during the regency of her father's Teatro San Carlos in Lisbon.

As soprano, Pacini was a major exponent of bel canto, such as Lucia di Lammermoor, I Puritani, Rigoletto, Manon and Rosina in The Barber of Seville. Pacini studied in Paris with Mathilde Marchesi and debuted in 1888 as Amina in Bellini's La Sonnambula in Lisbon Theater, where she continued to sing with great success until 1904. During 1889, Pacini sang in Milan, Palermo and London, and in 1890, appeared at the Teatro Real with La Sonnambula, returning regularly until 1905. Pacini performed in 1893 at the Liceo in Barcelona,  in 1894/95 in Warsaw and St. Petersburg, and in 1899 debuting at the Teatro Solis in Montevideo and Buenos Aires Politeama Theatre, where she met Dr. Marcelo Torcuato de Alvear, future president of Argentina (1922-1928). Alvear would follow Pacini around from one performance to another around the world for a number of years until she finally accepted his marriage proposal. In Covent Garden London, Pacini shared the stage with Enrico Caruso. The new century brought performances in different Italian theaters (Rome, Florence, the San Carlo in Naples and La Scala in Milan).

In 1907, at the height of her career, Pacini married Alvear, retired from performing and became a major benefactor. During World War I, the couple lived in Paris and Alvear's actions earned him the Legion of Honor by the French government.

In 1938, Alvear founded the Casa del Teatro in Buenos Aires, a haven for actors, with 45 rooms, two small museums and the headquarters of the Regina Theatre named in his honor.

References

1871 births
1965 deaths
Recipients of the Legion of Honour
19th-century Portuguese women opera singers
Portuguese operatic sopranos
Burials at La Recoleta Cemetery
First ladies and gentlemen of Argentina
20th-century Portuguese women opera singers
Portuguese emigrants to Argentina
Portuguese people of Italian descent
Portuguese people of Spanish descent
Singers from Lisbon